Justice Eugene Wilfred Jayewardene, KC (Sinhala:යුජින් විල්ෆ්‍රඩ් ජයවර්ධන; 11 June 1874 – 23 November 1932) was a Ceylonese (Sri Lankan) judge, lawyer and politician. He was a Judge of the Supreme Court of Ceylon and is the father of J. R. Jayewardene the first executive President of Sri Lanka.

Early life and education
Born to James Alfred Jayewardene, a Proctor who was the Deputy Coroner of Colombo, Jayewardene was educated at the Colombo Academy. In 1897 he served as the acting private secretary to Justice Granier before leaving for England for his studies in law. After being called to the bar at the Inner Temple in 1908 as a barrister, he returned to Ceylon and started a legal career as an advocate. He was the president of the Law Students' Union. He joined the Ceylon Light Infantry, became a volunteer officer of the Ceylon Defence Force as second lieutenant and later made captain.

Legal career
Jayewardene developed a successful legal practice in the Unofficial bar. He served as an acting district judge (1910–1911) and later a police magistrate, he became the commissioner of requests in 1916 and was a member of the Legal Council of Education.

Political career
In 1916, Jayewardene unsuccessfully sought nominations for the seat of Sinhalese representative to the Legislative Council of Ceylon. He then with his brother John Adrian St. Valentine Jayewardene joined the Ceylon National Congress and its congress committee in 1919. In 1920, he succeeded his brother Hector Alfred Jayewardene to the Colombo Municipal Council with the death of the latter. He contested the 1924 Legislative Council election and lost to Victor Corea, a distant relative who was backed by many of the leaders of the Ceylon National Congress. This effectively ended his political career.

Family

In 1905, Jayewardene married Agnes Helen Don Philip Wijewardena daughter of Muhandiram Tudugalage Don Philip Wijewardene and sister of D. R. Wijewardena. They had nine children, most notable of whom were J R Jayewardene and Hector Wilfred Jayewardene, QC. His brother Colonel Theodore Godfrey Wijesinghe Jayewardene was a Member of the State Council for Balangoda electorate.

See also 
List of political families in Sri Lanka

References

External links
 The JAYEWARDENE Ancestry

1874 births
1932 deaths
Puisne Justices of the Supreme Court of Ceylon
Sinhalese lawyers
Sri Lankan barristers
Ceylonese advocates
Ceylonese military personnel
Ceylon Light Infantry officers
Alumni of Royal College, Colombo
Members of the Inner Temple
20th-century King's Counsel
People from British Ceylon
Colombo municipal councillors
District Courts of Sri Lanka judges
Sinhalese judges
Eugene
Eugene
British Ceylon judges